The Sweden national under-17 football team is the football team representing Sweden in competitions for under-17-year-old players. The Swedish U17 team came into existence following the realignment of the UEFA European Under-16 Championship, which changed to be an under-17 competition in 2002.

In the 2013 UEFA European Under-17 Championship, Sweden reached the semi-finals where they were knocked out on penalties by Russia. In the 2013 FIFA U-17 World Cup they finished in third place after beating Argentina with 4–1 in the third-place match. Valmir Berisha scored three goals in the match and thus became the top scorer of the tournament.

Competitive record
 Champions   Runners-up   Third place   Fourth place   Tournament held on home soil

FIFA World Cup

Under-16 era

Under-17 era

UEFA European Championship

Under-16 era

Under-17 era

Current squad
 The following players were called up for the 2023 UEFA European Under-17 Championship qualification matches.
 Match dates: 20–26 October 2022
 Opposition: ,  and 
Caps and goals correct as of: 20 October 2022, after the match against

See also
 Sweden national football team
 Sweden Olympic football team
 Sweden national under-21 football team
 Sweden national under-20 football team
 Sweden national under-19 football team
 FIFA U-17 World Cup
 UEFA European Under-17 Championship
 Nordic Under-17 Football Championship

References

External links
 SvFF Team 2003 page
 SvFF Team 2004 page

European national under-17 association football teams
F